Edin Šehić (born 3 February 1995) is a Bosnian footballer who plays as a winger for Akritas Chlorakas in the Cypriot First Division.

Club career
Although Šehić's parents hail from the Bosnian city of Zavidovići, he was born in the Croatian city of Zagreb. His father, Jusuf played youth football for Krivaja Zavidovići.

From the age of five, Šehić started  training with Dubrava, before joining the youth setup of NK Zagreb at the age of nine. Three years later, at the age of 12, he became the youngest footballer to sign a scholarship contract for NK Zagreb.

In 2013, Šehić was promoted  to the first team and  signed  a seven-year deal. He scored  his first goal in a 4–3 win against Segesta. Although the club was relegated  from the first tier in 2015–16, he continued to play with the club. He scored a hat-trick in the first league match against Rudeš. He contributed with ten goals in the season, with Šehic playing as an attacker in the later half of the season.

On 22 April 2017, Šehić moved to Hajduk Split, after agreeing to a three-year deal. On 16 July, he made his debut in a 1–1 draw against Lokomotiva. In August, he made his UEFA Europa League debut in a 2–0 victory against Danish club Brøndby IF. Coming on as a 75th-minute substitute for Zvonimir Kožulj, Sehić received a yellow card twelve minutes later.

On 9 January 2019, Šehić terminated his contract with the club on mutual consent. On 22 January 2019, he signed for Ukrainian Premier League club Vorskla Poltava.

In August 2021, Šehić moved to the Cypriot Second Division side Akritas Chlorakas following a month-long stint at NK Rudeš. There, he helped the club achieve promotion, capping 28 times in the first season at the club.

International career
Šehić is a Bosnian-Herzegovinian youth international and has played for the under-18 team and under-21 team.

Career statistics

Club

Personal life
While watching the final of the 2013 Croatian Football Cup between Hajduk Split and Lokomotiva, Šehić, who is a Hajduk fan, was attacked.

References

External links

1995 births
Living people
Sportspeople from Zadar
Association football wingers
Association football fullbacks
Bosnia and Herzegovina footballers
NK Zagreb players
HNK Hajduk Split players
NK Rudar Velenje players
First Football League (Croatia) players
Croatian Football League players
Slovenian PrvaLiga players
Bosnia and Herzegovina youth international footballers
Bosnia and Herzegovina under-21 international footballers
Bosnia and Herzegovina expatriate footballers
Bosnia and Herzegovina expatriate sportspeople in Croatia
Bosnia and Herzegovina expatriate sportspeople in Slovenia
Expatriate footballers in Croatia
Expatriate footballers in Slovenia
Ukrainian Premier League players
FC Vorskla Poltava players
NK Rudeš players
Bosnia and Herzegovina expatriate sportspeople in Ukraine
Expatriate footballers in Ukraine
Bosniaks of Croatia